Hay River/Brabant Lodge Water Aerodrome  was located on the Mackenzie River, near Hay River, Northwest Territories, Canada. The airport was listed as abandoned in the 15 March 2007 Canada Flight Supplement.

See also
 Hay River/Merlyn Carter Airport
 Hay River Water Aerodrome

References

Defunct seaplane bases in the Northwest Territories